Technological University of the Philippines – Cavite Campus was established in 1979 as one of the three prototype technician institutes in the Philippines. It is a satellite campus located at Salawag, Damariñas, Cavite. At present, TUP Cavite offers programs in pre-baccalaureate and baccalaureate level.

History 

TUP-Cavite was established in 1979 in Salawag, Dasmariñas, Cavite donated by former senator and assemblywoman Helena Z. Benitez. The TUP-Cavite was created primarily to respond to the needs of the communities from Dasmariñas, Cavite for an affordable quality technology education.

In 1982, the TUP-Cavite officially started its operations offering three-year engineering technology programs with specialization in Automotive, Civil, Electrical, Electronics, Drafting, Mechanical and Stationery Marine. Today, the TUP-Cavite has transformed into a well-recognized institution of higher learning in the field of technology education.

Departments and academic programs

Departments 

Industrial Technology Department
Industrial Education Department
 Engineering Department
Mathematics, Physics, Chemistry Department
Liberal Arts Department
Physical Education Department
OJT and Placement Department

Baccalaureate programs 

Bachelor of Science in Civil Engineering
Bachelor of Science in Mechanical Engineering
Bachelor of Science in Electrical Engineering
Bachelor of Science in Industrial Education
Bachelor of Technical Teacher Education
Bachelor of Technology

 Bachelor of Engineering Technology

Majors 

Major in Automotive Technology
Major in Civil Technology
Major in Computer Engineering Technology
Major in Electrical Technology
Major in Electronics Engineering Technology
Major in Mechanical and Production Engineering Technology
Major in Power Plant Engineering Technology

References 

https://web.archive.org/web/20120314205422/http://www.tup.edu.ph/page.php?id=campuses

External links 
 http://www.tupcavite.org

Cavite
Universities and colleges in Cavite
Education in Cavite City
Educational institutions established in 1979
1979 establishments in the Philippines

pam:Technological University of the Philippines
tl:Teknolohikal na Unibersidad ng Pilipinas